Furious is the only album by the supergroup Soopa Villainz released in 2005. The album peaked at #9 on the Billboard "Top Independent Albums" chart, #42 on the "Top R&B/Hip-Hop Albums" chart and #92 on the Billboard 200.

Background and recording
Originally planned to be recorded and released in 2003, the project was put on hold due to solo releases from Joseph Bruce, who was releasing his debut solo EP Wizard of the Hood, and Esham was preparing to release an album titled Repentance. The project was put on the backburner until 2004 when rumors were debunked at the 2004 Gathering of the Juggalos about name changes and added members like Tech N9ne and Layzie Bone by Bruce and Smith themselves. In late 2004 Lavel was seen onstage with Bruce's brother Jumpsteady's hypeman during a 2005 tour sporting a hatchet man charm. When asked it was revealed that Lavel would be part of the project as well. Recording of the album lasted 4 months and it would turn out to be a true tour-de-force for Esham as he was also working on material for an unreleased solo album titled Club Evil. The entire album is a concept album based upon a story of the 4 members coming from another planet to take over the world.

Chart performance
The album was released on August 16, 2005. It peaked at No. 9 on the Billboard Top Independent Albums chart, No. 42 on the Top R&B/Hip-Hop Albums chart, and No. 92 on the Billboard 200.

Track listing

References

2005 debut albums
Soopa Villainz albums
Albums produced by Esham
Psychopathic Records albums
Concept albums